The Communauté de communes de Desvres-Samer is a communauté de communes, an intercommunal structure, in the Pas-de-Calais department, in the Hauts-de-France region, northern France. It was created in January 2009 by the merger of the former communautés de communes Pays de la Faïence de Desvres and Samer et environs. Its area is 245.3 km2, and its population was 23,225 in 2018. Its seat is in Desvres.

Composition
The communauté de communes consists of the following 31 communes:

Alincthun
Bellebrune
Belle-et-Houllefort
Bournonville
Brunembert
Carly
Colembert
Courset
Crémarest
Desvres
Doudeauville
Halinghen
Henneveux
Lacres
Longfossé
Longueville
Lottinghen
Menneville
Nabringhen
Quesques
Questrecques
Saint-Martin-Choquel
Samer
Selles
Senlecques
Tingry
Verlincthun
Vieil-Moutier
Le Wast
Wierre-au-Bois
Wirwignes

References

Commune communities in France
Intercommunalities of Pas-de-Calais